Greatest Hits is a greatest hits album by Better Than Ezra. It was released in 2005 via Rhino Records.

Track listing
 "King of New Orleans" (originally from Friction, Baby)
 "Good" (originally from Deluxe)
 "At the Stars" (originally from How Does Your Garden Grow?)
 "In the Blood" (Single Remix) (originally from Deluxe)
 "Live Again" (originally from How Does Your Garden Grow?)
 "Extra Ordinary" (originally from Closer)
 "Rosealia" (Single Remix) (originally from Deluxe)
 "Desperately Wanting" (originally from Friction, Baby)
 "Misunderstood" (originally from Closer)
 "This Time of Year (French Radio Version)" (originally from Deluxe)
 "Under You" (originally from How Does Your Garden Grow?)
 "Tremble" (originally from Artifakt)
 "One More Murder" (originally from How Does Your Garden Grow?)
 "Porcelain" (VooDoo Mix) (originally from Deluxe)
 "Laid" (James cover) (previously unreleased)
 "Wallflower" (originally from Artifakt)

References

Better Than Ezra albums
2005 greatest hits albums
Rhino Records compilation albums